Thomas C. Brown (born August 26, 1933) was an American politician in the state of Florida.

Brown was born in Daytona Beach, Florida and attended David Lipscomb College as well as the University of Florida. He served in the Florida House of Representatives for the 29th district from 1980 to 1986, as a Democrat. Brown also served in the Florida Senate from 1987 to 1991 for the 10th district.

References

|-

|-

1933 births
Living people
Democratic Party members of the Florida House of Representatives
People from Daytona Beach, Florida